William Boyde  (born March 1953) is a British actor, best known for his work on the British soap opera EastEnders (1986–1989, 1992, 2017). He was educated at Cheltenham College where he appeared as an extra in the film If...which was filmed at the school. His character James Willmott-Brown became one of the soap's most renowned villains after raping barmaid Kathy Beale (Gillian Taylforth) in 1988, and then terrorizing her in 1992. In September 2017, Boyde made an unannounced return to EastEnders and eventually departed on 28 December at the conclusion of his storyline - in which he was revealed as the boss of Max Branning (Jake Wood) in their vengeful plot to destroy the square.

Boyde has also appeared in Just William (1977); the BBC drama Secret Army (1978); Bergerac (1981) and the detective series Dempsey and Makepeace (1985). In 2001 Boyde played Tim the pub landlord in the Johnny Vaughan cult sitcom 'Orrible. In 2004 Boyde guest starred in the Doctor Who audio adventure The Harvest.

Theatre work includes; Dr Watson in A Study in Scarlet, Jack Favell in Rebecca and Charles Condomine in Blithe Spirit.

Boyde has also delivered numerous voice-overs for radio and television advertisements.

External links 
William Boyde at the British Film Institute

British male soap opera actors
Living people
1953 births
20th-century British male actors
Place of birth missing (living people)
21st-century British male actors
Date of birth missing (living people)